WB Electronics Warmate is a micro loitering munition developed by Polish defence contractor WB Group, entering into initial production in 2016. Warmate is in service with the Polish Army, which has ordered 1000 units (orders were put on hold after receiving only 100 units). It can be equipped with several different payloads, including fragmentation, HEAT and thermobaric warheads. 
There is also Warmate-R a reconnaissance version based on the same fuselage and ground segment. It integrates 3 cameras to provide multiple views: a 8mm lens facing forward, and a 8mm and 12mm optics providing smooth tilting capabilities from downward position (0 deg) to one side (90 deg). It can be equipped with daylight or thermal cameras with remote pan and tilt, as well as a laser target designator. It has a "Target Lock" mode for tracking moving targets and enables accurate target location data.

Specs and capabilities

Warmate
 Cruise airspeed: 
 Max horizontal speed 
 Max attack airspeed: 
 Cruise altitude:  AGL
 Ceiling:  AMSL
 Range:  
 Endurance: 60 minutes
 Empty weight:  
 Payload weight: 
 Max take-off weight: 
 Length:  
 Wingspan: ~ 
 Warhead: Training, HE-FRAG with 300g of TNT or HEAT (penetration 200-240mm vs RHA)
 Propulsion: Electric motor

Flight modes
 AUTO: follows a pre-programmed route.
 HOLD: orbits a point over the ground.
 FLY TO: fly to selected point with stable altitude.
 CRUISE: keep a particular altitude and flight direction, semi-manual control supported by autopilot in the camera direction.
 SEARCH: slow diving flight necessary for proper target selection.
 ATTACK: initiates the strike. The automated videotracker allows for a precise target hit even after the loss of communication.

Warmate R
 Range: 
 Endurance: 80 minutes
 Weight: 
 Operation ceiling:

Operators
 - Produced domestically.
 - 100 units.
 - acquired by the United Arab Emirates for the Libyan National Army in 2020
 - unspecified NATO member
 

 
Unspecified Middle Eastern operator

References

 http://www.defence24.com/358359,warmate-polish-loitering-munition-two-export-agreements-have-been-already-signed
  Mariusz Cielma, Warmate - nowy powietrzny środek wsparcia ogniowego, „Nowa Technika Wojskowa”, nr 5 (2016), s. 92–95, .
  Bartosz Głowacki, Uniwersalny towarzysz broni, „Rapot”, nr 5 (2016), s. 24–28, .
  Manufacturer's webpage

External link
 Warmate WB Group website

Unmanned aerial vehicles of Poland
Loitering munition